L-SAM is a South Korean missile defense system under development. It aims to shoot down ballistic missiles from North Korea in their terminal phase. It will use a trailer-mounted S band AESA radar.

It will be an upper-tier interceptor for a layered defense, as part of the Korean Air and Missile Defense (KAMD) project, slated to be ready in the early 2020s, with the lower tier composed of Patriot PAC-3 and KM-SAM batteries.

Performance levels were to be twice as superior to the Patriot and KM-SAM missiles, and it is designed based on a hot launch type VLS (Vertical Launching System) that is different from KM-SAM, which was developed based on a cold launch type VLS in Russia.

The L-SAM system is expected to use two types of interceptors: one for aircraft and the other for ballistic missiles. The missile interceptor will be capable of intercepting missiles at altitudes between 40-100 km. An L-SAM battery will consist of a multifunction radar, a command-and-control (C2) center, a combat control station, and four truck-mounted launchers, two for each missile type.

Its first successful test-firing occurred on 23 February 2022 to see if the interceptor could fly on an intended trajectory and fall accurately on a pre-set spot.

See also
THAAD
S-400 missile system
KM-SAM
Sky Bow

References

21st-century surface-to-air missiles
Surface-to-air missiles of South Korea
Missile defense
Anti-ballistic missiles of South Korea
Anti-aircraft warfare